Ferrovie del Sud Est (FSE) is a railway company in Apulia region, Italy. The company operates in the comuni south of Lecce and in the provinces of Bari, Brindisi and Taranto. The company also operates bus lines. In August 2016 its network was taken over by Ferrovie dello stato due to financial problems at the company. The company is now wholly owned by the Italian Transport Ministry.

Geography
The interior of Salento is a relatively flat plateau, which, however, slopes steeply down to the coasts of the Adriatic Sea and the Gulf of Taranto. The coast itself was very marshy, malarial and uninhabitable. Except for a few port cities, such as Bari, Otranto, Gallipoli and Taranto, all settlements are therefore located inland. Thus, the FSE routes only lead to the sea in the seaports mentioned and otherwise run in the interior of Apulia. The draining of the marshy coast only started in the 1930s. In recent years, large-scale seaside tourism has developed there, for which the railway runs much too far inland.

Lines

FSE operates trains on the following routes:

 Linea 1 Bari–Martina Franca–Taranto railway and Bari-Casamassima-Putignano railway
 Linea 2 Martina Franca–Lecce railway
 Linea 3 Novoli-Gagliano del Capo railway
 Linea 4 Gallipoli–Casarano railway
 Linea 5 Zollino–Gallipoli railway
 Linea 6 Maglie–Gagliano del Capo railway
 Linea 7 Lecce–Otranto railway

Fleet

Current fleet

Former fleet

See also

Bari Centrale railway station
Transportation in Italy

References

External links

Official website

Railway companies of Italy
Transport in Apulia
Railway companies established in 1931
Companies based in Apulia